David John Theobald (born 15 December 1978) is an English retired semi-professional football defender who played in the Football League for Brentford, Swansea City and Cambridge United. He played the majority of his career in non-league football, predominantly for Cambridge City, for whom he made over 270 appearances across three spells. He is currently first team coach at Cambridge City.

Playing career

Early years 
Theobald began his career in the youth system at Cambridge United, before joining the youth setup at Ipswich Town. He progressed to undertake a scholarship, but did not win a call into a first team squad before his release at the end of the 1998–99 season.

Brentford 
On 8 July 1999, Theobald signed a three-year contract with newly promoted Second Division club Brentford on a free transfer. He was utilised as cover for injuries and had a run in the team as a stand-in right back for the injured Danny Boxall during the 1999–00 season and in central defence for Scott Marshall during 2000–01. Theobald was named in the starting lineup for the 2001 Football League Trophy Final and received a runners-up medal. He was released after Brentford's defeat in the 2002 Second Division play-off Final and made just 37 appearances during three seasons at Griffin Park.

Swansea City 
On 26 July 2002, Theobald signed a one-year contract with Third Division club Swansea City on a free transfer. He made just 12 appearances before leaving the Vetch Field in February 2003.

Cambridge United 
On 7 February 2003, Theobald joined hometown Third Division club Cambridge United on a contract running until the end of the 2002–03 season. He made just one appearance before his contract expired.

Non-league football 
Between 2003 and 2018, Theobald had a long career in non-league football, predominantly with Cambridge City, for whom he made 274 appearances and scored 39 goals across three spells. He also played for Canvey Island, Kettering Town, St Albans City, Royston Town, Soham Town Rangers and Bishop's Stortford.

Managerial and coaching career

Soham Town Rangers 
On 8 October 2015, Theobald and fellow senior player Robbie Nightingale took over as joint-managers of Isthmian League First Division North club Soham Town Rangers. He remained in the role until 4 December 2016, when he followed Nightingale out of the club.

Cambridge City 
On 5 December 2016, Theobald returned to Southern League Premier Division club Cambridge City as first team coach.

Personal life 
Theobald attended Impington Village College. He is a Liverpool and Cambridge United supporter.

Career statistics

Honours 
Canvey Island
Isthmian League Premier Division: 2003–04

Cambridge City
 Southern League Cup: 2009–10

References

External links

David Theobald at cambridgecityfc.com

1978 births
Living people
Sportspeople from Cambridge
English footballers
Association football defenders
Ipswich Town F.C. players
Brentford F.C. players
Swansea City A.F.C. players
Cambridge United F.C. players
Canvey Island F.C. players
Bishop's Stortford F.C. players
Kettering Town F.C. players
St Albans City F.C. players
Cambridge City F.C. players
Royston Town F.C. players
English Football League players
Southern Football League players
National League (English football) players
Soham Town Rangers F.C. players
Soham Town Rangers F.C. managers
Isthmian League managers
English football managers